Mitchell Whalley (born 5 February 1999) is an Australian professional footballer who plays as a right winger.

References

External links

1999 births
Living people
Australian soccer players
Association football midfielders
Panserraikos F.C. players
National Premier Leagues players
Football League (Greece) players